Valley Ranch is a census-designated place in Plumas County, California, United States. The population was 109 at the 2010 census, up from 92 at the 2000 census.

Geography
Valley Ranch is located at  (39.738392, -120.567839).

Demographics

2010
At the 2010 census Valley Ranch had a population of 109. The racial makeup of Valley Ranch was 107 (98.2%) White, 0 (0.0%) African American, 0 (0.0%) Native American, 0 (0.0%) Asian, 0 (0.0%) Pacific Islander, 1 (0.9%) from other races, and 1 (0.9%) from two or more races. Hispanic or Latino of any race were 2 people (1.8%).

The whole population lived in households, no one lived in non-institutionalized group quarters and no one was institutionalized.

There were 58 households, 5 (8.6%) had children under the age of 18 living in them, 39 (67.2%) were opposite-sex married couples living together, 2 (3.4%) had a female householder with no husband present, 2 (3.4%) had a male householder with no wife present.  There were 1 (1.7%) unmarried opposite-sex partnerships, and 2 (3.4%) same-sex married couples or partnerships. 11 households (19.0%) were one person and 4 (6.9%) had someone living alone who was 65 or older. The average household size was 1.88.  There were 43 families (74.1% of households); the average family size was 2.09.

The age distribution was 5 people (4.6%) under the age of 18, 0 people (0%) aged 18 to 24, 6 people (5.5%) aged 25 to 44, 49 people (45.0%) aged 45 to 64, and 49 people (45.0%) who were 65 or older.  The median age was 63.8 years. For every 100 females, there were 101.9 males.  For every 100 females age 18 and over, there were 92.6 males.

There were 82 housing units at an average density of 72.1 per square mile, of the occupied units 54 (93.1%) were owner-occupied and 4 (6.9%) were rented. The homeowner vacancy rate was 0%; the rental vacancy rate was 33.3%.  104 people (95.4% of the population) lived in owner-occupied housing units and 5 people (4.6%) lived in rental housing units.

2000
At the 2000 census there were 92 people, 42 households, and 39 families in the CDP. The racial makeup of the CDP was 100.00% White. Hispanic or Latino of any race were 2.17%.

Of the 42 households 11.9% had children under the age of 18 living with them, 88.1% were married couples living together, 2.4% had a female householder with no husband present, and 4.8% were non-families. 4.8% of households were one person and none had someone living alone who was 65 or older. The average household size was 2.19 and the average family size was 2.20.

The age distribution was 7.6% under the age of 18, 5.4% from 18 to 24, 8.7% from 25 to 44, 52.2% from 45 to 64, and 26.1% 65 or older. The median age was 57 years. For every 100 females, there were 114.0 males. For every 100 females age 18 and over, there were 107.3 males.

The median household income was $82,736 and the median family income  was $82,736. Males had a median income of $61,250 versus $17,679 for females. The per capita income for the CDP was $32,505. None of the population and none of the families were below the poverty line.

Media
The primary local news source is the Portola Reporter, a newspaper published every Wednesday.

Politics

References

Census-designated places in Plumas County, California
Census-designated places in California